Chiasmocleis gnoma is a species of frog in the family Microhylidae.
It is endemic to Brazil.
Its natural habitats are subtropical or tropical moist lowland forests, intermittent freshwater marshes, and plantations .
It is threatened by habitat loss.

References

Sources

Chiasmocleis
Endemic fauna of Brazil
Taxonomy articles created by Polbot
Amphibians described in 2004